"Surrender" is a song composed and produced by Ashford & Simpson and sung from singer Diana Ross' album of the same name in 1971 on the Motown label. It was released as the album's third single on July 6, 1971.

The single became Ross' fifth top forty single since she became a solo artist shortly after leaving The Supremes. The song peaked at number 38 on the Billboard Hot 100, number 16 on the R&B chart. Outside the US, "Surrender" eventually hit the top ten in the United Kingdom, where it peaked at number 10, becoming her fourth consecutive top ten hit in that country.

Chart performance

Personnel
Lead vocal by Diana Ross
Background vocals by Ashford & Simpson and Joshie Armstead
Instrumentation by The Funk Brothers

Cover versions
In 1983, The Fifth Dimension recorded a disco-flavored cover version of this song for Sutra Records, featuring Florence LaRue on lead vocals. It is virtually the same song but is credited to writers Lenny Stack and Cheryl Christians instead of Ashford & Simpson.

References

1971 singles
Diana Ross songs
Songs written by Nickolas Ashford
Songs written by Valerie Simpson
Song recordings produced by Ashford & Simpson
1971 songs
Motown singles